Verkhneitkulovo (Ürge Etqol) is a rural locality (a selo) and the administrative centre of Itkulovsky Selsoviet, Ishimbaysky District, Bashkortostan, Russia. The population was 888 as of 2010. There are 12 streets.

Geography 
Verkhneitkulovo is located 25 km southeast of Ishimbay (the district's administrative centre) by road. Urazbayevo is the nearest rural locality.

References 

Rural localities in Ishimbaysky District